John Dinneen (23 March 1867 – 1 January 1942) was an Irish Farmers' Party politician. A farmer, he was first elected to Dáil Éireann at the 1922 general election as a Farmers' Party Teachta Dála (TD) for the Cork East and North East constituency. He was re-elected at the 1923 general election for the Cork East constituency. He lost his seat at the June 1927 general election.

His nephew Liam Ahern served as a Fianna Fáil Senator and TD from 1957 to 1974 and his grand-nephew Michael Ahern, son of Liam Ahern, has been a Fianna Fáil TD for Cork East from 1982 to 2011.

In June 1922 the Bishop of Cloyne Robert Browne, contributed £20 each to the election funds of Michael Hennessy and Dinneen, Commercial and Farmer pro-Treaty candidates respectively for the Cork East and North East constituency.

See also
Families in the Oireachtas

References

External links

1867 births
1942 deaths
Farmers' Party (Ireland) TDs
Members of the 3rd Dáil
Members of the 4th Dáil
Politicians from County Cork
Irish farmers
People of the Irish Civil War (Pro-Treaty side)